István Kovács (born 7 May 1944) is a Hungarian actor. He appeared in more than sixty films since 1964.

Selected filmography

References

External links 

1944 births
Living people
Hungarian male film actors